Rage were an English dance music group composed of producers Barry Leng and Duncan Hannant, drummer Hans Greeve, and fronted by vocalists Tony Jackson (1992–1993) and Steve Lee (1995).  The group were renamed En-Rage in Germany, to avoid confusion with the German band Rage.

Career 
In 1992, the group released a dance cover version of Bryan Adams' "Run to You", which reached number 3 on the UK Singles Chart.  Subsequent singles, including a dance remake of "House of the Rising Sun", fared less well on the chart, although an album titled Saviour was released in 1993.

Singer Tony Jackson, who had previously performed backing vocals for Billy Ocean, Amii Stewart and Paul Young among others, died in June 2001.

Members

Studio 
Tony Jackson – vocals
Steve Lee – vocals
Hans Greeve – drums
Barry Leng – producer
Duncan Hannant – producer

Live 
Tony Jackson – vocals
Steve Lee – vocals
Jeffrey Sayadian – guitar
Angela Lupino – bass
Toby Sadler – keyboard, piano, backing vocals
Pierson Grange – drums

Discography

Studio albums 
Saviour (1993) – AUS #144, AUT #40

Compilation albums 
Run to You – The Essential (2010) (digital-only)

Singles

References 

English house music groups
British Eurodance groups
English pop music groups
Musical groups established in 1992
Musical groups disestablished in 1995